Galotxetes (also known as Galotxes) is a modality of the Valencian pilota. As usual in the Valencian pilota, it's a handball game where players stand in front of each other. The differences with the main variant are the unusual court and the unique ball used. Despite the name, it has no relation with another Valencian pilota variant, the Galotxa.

Court 
The court, called galotxeta (hence the name of this modality), is a 4 walled room, 20m long and 3 m wide. In the middle there's a 1 m high net, it's not tense at all, so its height is a bit shorter on the center. The court is so divided in two sides: the "traure'''' and the "rest".

On the rest side, at its right end of the net, there's an 80 cm high flat stone (the "tamboret") used to bounce on it the ball in the service of every doubles game. On the traure side there's a rectangle on the ground next to the left wall, that's where the ball must first bounce after the service of every doubles game. In the case of playing singles the ball must be bounced on a point into that rectangle of the traure.

Also, the walls at the end of every side are called "frontons". The rest frontó is high so every ball returns to the court, but the traure frontó is only 1.5 m high, so public may watch the game in the gallery behind it. In case the ball is sent over the traure wall, the player on the traure must bounce it on the wall and strike the ball on the air (if it already bounced on the ground) or after a first bounce (if it didn't bounce at all).

At the ground of those two frontons there's a 45° bevel, the "tamborí", it allows to raise up low balls with quick and unexpected bouncings.

As for now, all those elements are common to the main Valencian pilota court, the trinquet, being the main difference the size (smaller) and the lack of stairs for the spectators to seat along the left wall. But a unique trait of the "galotxetes" are the "caixonets" ("small drawers"), they are a kind of open doors on every corner. They are used as a direct point place for the sender.

Until recently, this modality was played in the whole comarca of Vinalopó Mitjà, but actually there are court for this modality only in the "Centro Deportivo de Monòver", El Pinós and La Romana, and those last two are not covered. However, the oldest court is in Abdet (Marina Baixa), dated from 1772.

 Rules Galotxetes may be played singles (1 vs. 1) or doubles (2 vs. 2), being the only difference the place to serve from (the point on the traure if singles, and the tamboret if doubles).

The rules are simple, and common to many other handballs:
The ball must be struck with the hand and sent to the other side without touching the net, once there it must be sent back after a first bounce on the ground or in the air. The ball may bounce on the walls or on the tamborí as if they were "air". The quinze is won when the opponent cannot throw back the ball, be it because the ball bounces twice on the ground, the ball touches the ball, or the ball is sent to the caixonet.

The scoring system follows the usual scoring system in Valencian pilota: a number of points (commonly, 12) divided in four quinzes: 15, 30, val and joc.

 Ball 
The ball used to play galotxetes'' is different from any other ball used in the Valencian pilota modalities. This one is a hand-made ball of clothing covered by sticking plaster. Its diameter is 7 cm and weighs 60 grams.

Valencian pilota
Sports originating in Spain